Elections are taking place in Eastern Visayas for 13 seats in the House of Representatives of the Philippines on May 9, 2022. Four of these seats are uncontested — lone district of Biliran, and the first, third and 5th districts of Leyte's. Four are incumbents.

The candidate with the most votes will win that district's seat for the 19th Congress of the Philippines.

With hundred percent of certificates of canvass transmitted, administration and allied parties held all of the 13 congressional seats for the region.

References 

2022 Philippine local elections
May 2022 events in the Philippines